Mullinville is a city in Kiowa County, Kansas, United States.  As of the 2020 census, the population of the city was 197.

History
The first post office at Mullinville was established in September 1884.

Mullinville was laid out in about 1886. It was named for Alfred A. Mullin, a pioneer settler and storekeeper.

Geography
Mullinville is located at  (37.586706, -99.476387).

Demographics

2010 census
As of the census of 2010, there were 255 people, 107 households, and 68 families residing in the city. The racial makeup of the city was 94.9% White, 0.8% African American, 0.4% Native American, 0.8% Asian, 1.6% from other races, and 1.6% from two or more races. Hispanic or Latino of any race were 8.2% of the population.

There were 107 households, of which 27.1% had children under the age of 18 living with them, 52.3% were married couples living together, 7.5% had a female householder with no husband present, 3.7% had a male householder with no wife present, and 36.4% were non-families. 32.7% of all households were made up of individuals, and 19.6% had someone living alone who was 65 years of age or older. The average household size was 2.38 and the average family size was 2.99.

The median age in the city was 41.3 years. 26.3% of residents were under the age of 18; 5.4% were between the ages of 18 and 24; 23.6% were from 25 to 44; 21.6% were from 45 to 64; and 23.1% were 65 years of age or older. The gender makeup of the city was 49.4% male and 50.6% female.

2000 census
As of the census of 2000, there were 279 people, 113 households, and 80 families residing in the city. The racial makeup of the city was 97.85% White, 1.43% Asian, and 0.72% from two or more races. Hispanic or Latino of any race were 1.43% of the population.

There were 113 households, out of which 31.0% had children under the age of 18 living with them, 63.7% were married couples living together, 5.3% had a female householder with no husband present, and 29.2% were non-families. 29.2% of all households were made up of individuals, and 18.6% had someone living alone who was 65 years of age or older. The average household size was 2.47 and the average family size was 3.04.

In the city, the population was spread out, with 28.3% under the age of 18, 3.9% from 18 to 24, 22.9% from 25 to 44, 21.1% from 45 to 64, and 23.7% who were 65 years of age or older. The median age was 41 years. For every 100 females, there were 93.8 males. For every 100 females age 18 and over, there were 96.1 males.

The median income for a household in the city was $36,875, and the median income for a family was $39,375. Males had a median income of $32,500 versus $21,667 for females. The per capita income for the city was $18,258. About 10.5% of families and 9.2% of the population were below the poverty line, including 11.6% of those under the age of eighteen and 13.0% of those 65 or over.

Education
The community is served by Kiowa County USD 422 public school district.  Mullinville is home to 21st Century Learning Academy, an accredited virtual school of US$422.  In 2011, US$422 absorbed the former Mullinville USD 424, which had dissolved.

The Mullinville High School mascot was Tigers. The Mullinville Tigers won the following Kansas State High School championships:
 1953 Boys Track & Field - Class B 
 1964 Boys Basketball - Class BB 
 1981 Boys Basketball - Class 1A

Notable people
 M.T. Liggett (1930-2017), American Folk Sculptor, was born in Mullinville.

Gallery

References

Further reading

External links

 Mullinville - Directory of Public Officials
 , from Hatteberg's People on KAKE TV news
 Mullinville city map, KDOT

Cities in Kansas
Cities in Kiowa County, Kansas